Proconica  is a genus of moths of the family Crambidae.

Species
Proconica flaviguttalis Hampson, 1899
Proconica nigrcyanalis Hampson, 1899

References

Natural History Museum Lepidoptera genus database

Pyraustinae
Crambidae genera
Taxa named by George Hampson